is a Japanese football player of a Peruvian father. He plays for Albirex Niigata.

Career
Shunsuke Mori joined J1 League club Albirex Niigata in 2017, but in January 2018 he switched to Tokyo Verdy on loan.

Club statistics
Updated to 22 February 2020.

References

External links
Profile at Tokyo Verdy

1994 births
Living people
Kwansei Gakuin University alumni
Association football people from Hyōgo Prefecture
Japanese footballers
J1 League players
J2 League players
Albirex Niigata players
Tokyo Verdy players
Association football midfielders